Alexandre Garcia Ribeiro (born May 8, 1984), or simply Alexandre, is a Brazilian football striker.

Career
Alexandre began his playing career with Associação Esportiva Araçatuba in Campeonato Paulista Série A3 in 2003.

References

External links 

CBF 
Guardian Stats Centre
figueirense.com 

1984 births
Living people
Brazilian footballers
Brazilian expatriate footballers
União Bandeirante Futebol Clube players
Figueirense FC players
Guaratinguetá Futebol players
Mogi Mirim Esporte Clube players
ABC Futebol Clube players
Daejeon Hana Citizen FC players
Brazilian expatriate sportspeople in South Korea
K League 1 players
Expatriate footballers in South Korea
Barretos Esporte Clube players
Association football forwards